This is a list of fellows of the Royal Society elected in 1798.

Fellows
.
 Adam Afzelius (1751–1837), Swedish physician/botanist
 Alexander Duncan (1758–1832), H.E.I.C surgeon 
 Finlay Fergusson
 Prince Demetrius Gallitzin (1738–1803), Russian ambassador 
 Nicholas Gay (d. 1803)
 Thomas Greene (1737–1810, antiquarian 
 Henry Gregg, barrister (c.1759–1826)
 Benjamin Hobhouse (1757–1831), barrister and MP 
 Samuel Jackson, surgeon 
 Stephen Lee (d. 1835), astronomer 
 Martin van Marum (1750–1837), Dutch physician 
 William Mudge (1762–1820), Army surveyor 
 William Paterson (1755–1810), Army officer 
 John Rennie the Elder (1761–1821), civil engineer 
 John Ryan (d. 1808) 
 Johann Hieronymus Schroter (1745–1816), German astronomer

References

1798 in science
1798
1798 in Great Britain